Spencer Akira Howe (born September 11, 1996) is an American pair skater. With his skating partner, Emily Chan, he is a two-time Four Continents silver medalist (2022 and 2023) silver medalist, a two-time Grand Prix silver medalist (2022 Skate America; 2022 NHK Trophy), and a two-time U.S. national medalist (silver in 2023; pewter in 2022).

Career

Early years 
Early in his pairs career, Howe competed in partnership with Ami Koga for Japan. They were coached by Richard Gauthier, Bruno Marcotte, Sylvie Fullum, and Cynthia Lemaire in Saint-Leonard, Quebec, Canada, and appeared at two ISU Junior Grand Prix events in 2016.

Competing with Nadine Wang, Howe finished fourth in junior pairs at the 2018 U.S. Championships.

Partnership with Chan

Early years
Howe teamed up with Emily Chan in 2019, and the two decided to train at the Skating Club of Boston in Norwood, Massachusetts, coached by Aleksey Letov and Olga Ganicheva. In their second season together, Chan/Howe placed seventh at the 2020 Skate America and fifth at the 2021 U.S. Championships.

2021–22 season
Chan/Howe finished ninth at the 2021 CS Warsaw Cup. In January, they won pewter for fourth place at the 2022 U.S. Championships and were sent to the 2022 Four Continents Championships in Tallinn, Estonia. Ranked third in the short and second in the free, they moved ahead of Canada's Walsh/Michaud to take the silver medal behind fellow Americans Lu/Mitrofanov.

2022–23 season
The international pairs scene going into the 2022–23 season was greatly altered by the International Skating Union banning all Russian skaters in response to their country's invasion of Ukraine. With more podium opportunities for pairs outside of Russia, Chan/Howe began with a silver medal win at the 2022 CS U.S. Classic. Howe said that they were pleased with the outcome in light of injury troubles that had hindered their preparations. 

Given two Grand Prix assignments for the first time, they won the silver medal at the 2022 Skate Canada International. They won a second silver medal weeks later at the 2022 NHK Trophy, qualifying for the Grand Prix Final. Despite a jump error in the free skate, Chan said they were "very happy with our skate." Chan/Howe struggled at the Final, finishing sixth of six teams.

Chan/Howe won the silver medal at the 2023 U.S. Championships, a new best podium placement at the national championships. Chan said they were both "really grateful" for the result. With national champions Knierim/Frazier declining to attend the 2023 Four Continents Championships in favour of a paid appearance at Art on Ice, Chan/Howe became the highest-ranked American team in attendance at a home ISU championship. In the short program, Howe fell on his triple toe attempt, but they still placed third in the segment. In the free skate, they overtook Canadians Stellato/Deschamps for the silver medal, their second. Chan called it "a special moment for both of us."

Programs

With Chan

With Koga

Competitive highlights 
GP: Grand Prix; CS: Challenger Series; JGP: Junior Grand Prix. Pewter medals (fourth place) awarded only at U.S. national and subnational events.

Pairs with Chan for the United States

Pairs with Wang for the United States

Pairs with Koga for Japan

Mens Singles for the United States

References

External links 
ISU Biography
U.S. Figure Skating Biography

1996 births
Living people
American male pair skaters
Sportspeople from Burbank, California
20th-century American people
21st-century American people
Four Continents Figure Skating Championships medalists